Anssi Pentsinen (born 30 August 1986 in Jämsä) is a Finnish cross-country skier.

Pentsinen competed at the 2014 Winter Olympics for Finland. He placed 34th in the qualifying round in the sprint, failing to advance to the knockout stages.

As of April 2014, his best showing at the World Championships is 16th, in both the team and individual sprints in 2013.

Pentsinen made his World Cup debut in March 2008. As of April 2014, his best finish is 4th, in a freestyle sprint race at Düsseldorf in 2011–12. His best World Cup overall finish is 53rd, in 2012–13. His best World Cup finish in a discipline is 17th, in the 2012-13 sprint.

Cross-country skiing results
All results are sourced from the International Ski Federation (FIS).

Olympic Games

World Championships

World Cup

Season standings

References

External links

1986 births
Living people
Olympic cross-country skiers of Finland
Cross-country skiers at the 2014 Winter Olympics
Cross-country skiers at the 2018 Winter Olympics
People from Jämsä
Finnish male cross-country skiers
Sportspeople from Central Finland
21st-century Finnish people